Thomas Henry Snowden was an English professional footballer who played as a winger.

References

English footballers
Association football wingers
Newcastle United F.C. players
South Shields F.C. (1889) players
Burnley F.C. players
English Football League players
Year of death missing
Year of birth missing